Constantin Valentin Budescu (born 19 February 1989) is a Romanian professional footballer who plays as an attacking midfielder or a forward for Liga I club Petrolul Ploiești.

He began his senior career at Petrolul Ploiești, amassing over 150 appearances throughout the course of six seasons before transferring to rival team Astra Ploiești in 2011. With the latter side, which relocated to Giurgiu, he won one Liga I, one Cupa României and one Supercupa României. Since first leaving Astra in 2016, he has had multiple brief spells, of which three abroad with clubs in China and Saudi Arabia.

Budescu registered his debut for the Romania national team in 2015, at age 26. In 2017, he was awarded the Romanian Footballer of the Year trophy by the Gazeta Sporturilor newspaper.

Club career

Early career / Petrolul Ploiești
Budescu was born in Manasia, a commune near Urziceni, Ialomița County. At the age of 12, with his first team Rapid Sălciile, he once scored "13 goals in one match". In 2007, Budescu made his debut in the Liga II for Petrolul Ploiești while still a junior player.

He gradually imposed himself as a regular first-team member, which caught the eye of Rapid București, Politehnica Timișoara and FC Brașov. In 2009, following the transfer of Laurențiu Marinescu to Unirea Urziceni, Budescu took over his number 10 jersey.

Astra Giurgiu
In the summer of 2011, Budescu signed a contract with cross-town rivals Astra Ploiești, later relocated and renamed Astra Giurgiu. On 21 July 2013, he scored his first hat-trick in the Liga I, in a 4–0 away win against Viitorul Constanța. Four days later, during their first ever appearance in the UEFA Europa League, he netted twice in a 2–1 success at Omonia as his team played 30 minutes with one player less and qualified to the third round; due to his exploits, he was dubbed the "Hero of Nicosia".

On 21 August 2014, Budescu converted a penalty against French side Lyon in the first leg of the Europa League play-off (2–1 away win, qualification on the away goals rule). On 6 August of the following year, in the same competition but in the third qualifying round, his second leg brace helped defeat West Ham United 2–1 at home and 4–3 on aggregate.

Dalian Yifang
In January 2016, Astra rejected an offer from FC Steaua București for Budescu. The following month, he signed a three-year contract with China League One club Dalian Yifang for an undisclosed fee, with a salary worth €3 million plus €500,000 upon signature.

Return to Astra Giurgiu
Budescu was loaned to his previous club Astra Giurgiu in August 2016, before being released by the Asians the following January. On the 26th that month, he chose to stay once again with Astra, joining on a one-and-a-half-year contract. On 16 February, Budescu netted a goal against Genk in a 2–2 Europa League round of 32 home draw.

FCSB
On 10 June 2017, FCSB activated Budescu's €750,000 release clause. He subsequently signed a four-year deal with the club, being assigned the number 11 shirt. Budescu scored on his debut on 16 July, in a 2–1 home victory against Voluntari. He again found the net nine days later, converting a free kick in 2–2 home draw with Viktoria Plzeň in the Champions League third qualifying round.

On 20 December, Budescu was announced by the Gazeta Sporturilor newspaper as the winner of the 2017 Romanian Footballer of the Year award. On 15 February 2018, he provided an assist as Harlem Gnohéré scored the only goal of a Europa League round of 32 first leg match with Lazio.

Al-Shabab
On 28 June 2018, Budescu agreed to a three-year deal with Saudi Professional League team Al-Shabab for a reported transfer fee of €2.5 million, rejoining his former Astra Giurgiu head coach Marius Șumudică.

Late career

On 19 August 2019, Astra Giurgiu owner Ioan Niculae confirmed that Budescu returned for a fourth stint at the club after agreeing to a two-year contract. On 8 February 2021, he signed for Saudi Professional League team Damac. 

After only twelve games during the remainder of the 2020–21 season, Budescu returned to Romania with FCSB. He left them on 4 January 2022 on a mutual agreement, after only scoring once and being criticised by owner Gigi Becali for his performances. Fifteen days later, he put pen to paper on a contract with Voluntari.

On 2 August 2022, Budescu returned to his boyhood club Petrolul Ploiești, which had recently promoted back to the Liga I. He signed a two-year deal and was given the number 10 shirt. Budescu registered his first appearance and goal in the top flight for Petrolul on 24 October, converting a penalty in a 2–0 home win over Argeș Pitești.

International career
Budescu played an unofficial match for Romania B in a 1–4 friendly defeat against Poland, in February 2013. His debut for the full side was made two years later, as he came on as a 78th-minute substitute in a 0–0 away draw against Hungary for the UEFA Euro 2016 qualifiers.

On 11 October 2015, Budescu scored a brace against the Faroe Islands, helping the country achieve qualification by finishing second in the group one point behind Northern Ireland.

Style of play
Budescu is regarded as a skilful player who can create chances and goalscoring opportunities for both himself and his teammates. Hence, he has been deployed in a wide number of positions, such as an attacking midfielder, a winger, a supporting striker or even a main striker.

Budescu's shot accuracy allows him to be an exceptional free kick and penalty kick taker, and he is known to sometimes put opposing goalkeepers to test from long range or even from corner kicks. In spite of his undoubtable talent, he has often been criticised for his lack of work rate, himself stating that he "only got serious [...] after turning 30 years old".

Personal life
In October 2014, Budescu married his partner Mădălina in the city of Ploiești, with then Astra Giurgiu teammate Daniel Coman acting as best man. He is nicknamed Sărmăluță (Romanian for "little Sarma"), due to his weakness for traditional food and body weight issues.

Career statistics

Club

International

Scores and results list Romania's goal tally first, score column indicates score after each Budescu goal.

Honours
Astra Giurgiu
Liga I: 2015–16
Cupa României: 2013–14; runner-up 2016–17, 2020–21
Supercupa României: 2014

Voluntari
Cupa României runner-up: 2021–22

Individual
Gazeta Sporturilor Romanian Footballer of the Year: 2017; runner-up: 2015
Gala Fotbalului Românesc Romanian Footballer of the Year: 2015, 2017
Liga I Team of the Season: 2016–17, 2017–18
DigiSport Liga I Player of the Month: July 2015, August 2015, December 2016

References

External links

1989 births
Living people
People from Ialomița County
Romanian footballers
Association football midfielders
Liga I players
Liga II players
China League One players
Saudi Professional League players
FC Petrolul Ploiești players
FC Astra Giurgiu players
Dalian Professional F.C. players
FC Steaua București players
Al-Shabab FC (Riyadh) players
Damac FC players
FC Voluntari players
Romania international footballers
Romanian expatriate footballers
Expatriate footballers in China
Expatriate footballers in Saudi Arabia
Romanian expatriate sportspeople in China
Romanian expatriate sportspeople in Saudi Arabia